NK Stupnik is a Croatian football club based in the municipality of Stupnik, near the city of Zagreb.

Football clubs in Croatia
Association football clubs established in 1972
1972 establishments in Croatia